The original incarnation of Walt Disney Television was the name of the American television production division of The Walt Disney Company.

Walt Disney Television's television productions were broadcast, mostly on Disney Channel, Disney Junior, Disney XD, and ABC.

Today, the majority of the 'old' Walt Disney Television's productions are animated series which are produced through Walt Disney Television Inc. (simply known as 'New' Walt Disney Television or just Disney Television). The last known live-action series produced by Walt Disney Television was Smart Guy which ran for three seasons from 1997 to 1999 on the now-defunct WB Television Network. It was succeeded in purpose by It's a Laugh Productions.

Background
While initially not interest in television back in the 1930s, Walt Disney changed his mind seeing television at least as a promotional tool. Most studios were generating revenue by selling off their permanent television rights to their films made before 1948, while Disney held on to the company's film rights. Thus Walt Disney Productions was the first of the film industry, which saw television as an adversary, to enter the television production field. Walt Disney Productions did an hour-long special on Christmas Day 1950 for NBC then in 1951 for CBS. The specials used Disney film clips, short films and promoted the upcoming Alice in Wonderland theatrical film. Both specials had excellent ratings. The networks pursued Disney to do a full series for them. Disney used this interest in a series to request funding for Disneyland, which the newly merged American Broadcasting-Paramount Theatres did for its American Broadcasting Company (ABC) with the airing of the Disneyland anthology series. The "Operation Undersea" episode of the series garnered Disney its first Emmy Award. The series quickly became ABC's first series to hit the top 20 in ratings.

Disney's entry into television impacted the television industry as the Disney anthology show marked a move from live to filmed delivery of television shows. Filming made it possible for higher production value. Also, a couple of the major film studios copied the show's format with MGM Parade and Warner Bros. Presents. Both shows did not last.

With the series' "Davy Crockett" episodes generating high sale of merchandise, Disney Productions produced The Mickey Mouse Club, the first youth audience television program and a daily afternoon show. In 1957, Disney was producing the series Zorro. It lasted until 1959. In 1961, Disney severed its terms with ABC and moved its weekly program to NBC, where it stayed for nearly 20 years until 1981. For years, its anthology series was Disney's lone program on network television. In 1972, it collaborated with the NBC owned-and-operated stations group to launch The Mouse Factory. It didn't last long, and it was canned in 1973.

In 1975, Disney launched a partnership with SFM Media Service Corporation to distribute The Mickey Mouse Club onto syndication starting in 1975, leading up to new episodes in 1977.

In 1980, Disney severed its exclusive deal with NBC, and jumped into line as a production company for television programs. The following year, it signed a production agreement with CBS to bring anthology series to the network, and the addition of producing new original programs. Disney had broken its 23-year streak of producing anthology series only in order to produce its first TV show since Zorro's cancellation in 1982, Herbie the Love Bug, which only lasted one season on CBS. This was followed by three short-lived sitcoms produced Gun Shy, Small & Frye and Zorro and Son, which also aired on CBS, but never lasted long, which led to the demise of the anthology series in 1983.

History
Walt Disney Television was formed in 1983, as the Walt Disney Pictures Television Division, the name was later shortened to Walt Disney Television in 1988. Until 1983, Disney shows were aired under the banner of the parent company, then named Walt Disney Productions. Disney made its firsts in 1985, which are Wildside, which is produced under the Touchstone Films label (now ABC Signature), and two animated cartoons The Adventures of the Gummi Bears on NBC and Wuzzles on CBS.

In August 1994, with the departure of Walt Disney Studios chairman Jeffrey Katzenberg, its filmed entertainment business was split into two, with Walt Disney Pictures continuing with motion pictures and the newly created Walt Disney Television and Telecommunications for television under Joe Roth and Richard Frank respectively.

At the time when Disney merged with Capital Cities/ABC, Disney Television was a part of Walt Disney Television and Telecommunications (WDTT). With the retirement of WDTT president Dennis Hightower in April 1996 and ongoing post-merger reorganization, Walt Disney Television (along with its Animation unit) was transferred back to The Walt Disney Studios.

The Walt Disney Television group, upon the departure of its president Dean Valentine in September 1997, was split into two units: Walt Disney Television (WDT) and Walt Disney Network Television (WDNT), reporting to Walt Disney Studios chairman Joe Roth. WDT would be headed by Charles Hirschhorn as president and consisted of Disney Telefilms for ABC, the-direct-to video-unit, and Walt Disney Television Animation. WDNT would handle primetime programming, headed by David Neuman as president. Neuman was also named president of Touchstone Television. In March 1998, WDNT was placed under Buena Vista TV Productions, a newly formed group under chairman Lloyd Braun, along with Touchstone Television. in June 1998, Neuman left as did his top two executives due to this reorganization.

In late 1999, Walt Disney Television Studios (also called Buena Vista Television Group or Buena Vista Television Productions), were transferred from the Disney Studios to the ABC Television Network to merge with ABC's primetime division, ABC Entertainment, forming the ABC Entertainment Television Group. Walt Disney Television Studios was later folded into Touchstone Television (became ABC Studios, now known as ABC Signature) in 2000, while its name continued to be used on new cartoons from Walt Disney Television Animation (now Disney Television Animation, which is now a unit of Disney Channels Worldwide) until 2003, when it disappeared for good.

Names
 Walt Disney Pictures Television Division (1983–1985)
 Walt Disney Pictures Television (1985–1986)
 Walt Disney Television (1985–2003) (become current name of television asset divisions in 2019)
 Walt Disney Pictures and Television (1988–2007)

Television series

Disney Telefilms

Disney Telefilms (DTF), or Walt Disney Telefilms, was a TV film production company and a division of Walt Disney Television. The division provided movies for The Wonderful World of Disney.

Telefilms history
With the purchase of Capital Cities/ABC Inc., Disney CEO Michael Eisner wanted to relaunch The Wonderful World of Disney on ABC in 1996 with a movie franchise. Walt Disney Telefilms was formed to produce films for the anthology TV series by 1995. Leah Keith was transferred from Walt Disney Pictures that year to the telefilms division.

Hollywood Pictures executive vice president Charles Hirschhorn oversaw Walt Disney Telefilms as president in June 1996, reporting to Dean Valentine, president of Walt Disney Television and Walt Disney Television Animation, for the Telefilms unit. Mike Karz, a former vice president of Mandeville Films, signed a first look deal with the company through his shingle, Karz Entertainment, based at Walt Disney Studios in May 1997. On September 28, 1997, the division launched the anthology show. The division produced 17 films in nine months while it only expected to provide 16 movies. On October 5, 1997, Disney Telefilms' first production, Toothless, debuted on The Wonderful World of Disney.

The Walt Disney Television group, upon the departure of Dean Valentine in September 1997, was split into two units: Walt Disney Television (WDT) and Walt Disney Network Television (WDNT). WDT would be headed by Hirschhorn as president and consisted of Disney Telefilms and Walt Disney Television Animation, including Disney MovieToons/Disney Video Premiere. Leah Keith and Peter Green were promoted to production vice presidents for the division in March 1998.

Telefilms filmography

See also
 Disney Television Animation
 Walt Disney Television, current television division using former production company name
 Jetix Animation Concepts
 List of Disney television series

References

External links
 Walt Disney Television at Museum

Television production companies of the United States
Disney Media Networks
Disney production studios
Television syndication distributors
American companies established in 1983
American companies disestablished in 2003
Walt Disney Studios (division)
The Walt Disney Company subsidiaries